Tres Cruces bus station (Spanish:Terminal Tres Cruces) is the main bus terminal in Uruguay. It is located in the Tres Cruces district, in Montevideo.

Overview 

On July 11, 1991, President Luis A. Lacalle signed the agreement for the construction of the Bus Terminal.  The building was designed by the studio of the architect Guillermo Gómez Platero, with the collaboration of Enrique Cohe and Roberto Alberti. The station was inaugurated on November 16, 1994.  The structure is brick. Tres Cruces concentrates the largest passenger traffic in the country, from there national and international destinations are operated. Around 20,000,000 people visit this bus station.  In the building, there is also a shopping center.

See also 

 Transportation in Uruguay
 Tres Cruces district

References 

Transport in Uruguay
Transport in Montevideo
Bus stations in South America
Shopping malls in Montevideo